Teodoro Manuel Parrado (1894 – death unknown) was a Cuban first baseman in the Negro leagues and the Cuban League in the 1920s.

A native of Havana, Cuba, Parrado made his Negro leagues debut in 1921 with the Cuban Stars (West), and played for the club again in 1922. In the winter of 1922–23, he played for the Leopardos de Santa Clara of the Cuban League, and in 1924 he played minor league baseball for the Elmira Colonels. Parrado finished his career with the Cuban Stars (East) in 1927.

References

External links
 and Baseball-Reference Black Baseball stats and Seamheads

1894 births
Date of birth missing
Place of death missing
Year of death missing
Cuban Stars (East) players
Cuban Stars (West) players
Leopardos de Santa Clara players
Baseball infielders